List of hospitals in Wyoming (U.S. state), sorted by hospital name.

 Campbell County Memorial Hospital - Gillette
 Carbon County Memorial Hospital - Rawlins
 Castle Rock Hospital District - Green River
 Cheyenne Regional Medical Center - Cheyenne
 Community Hospital - Torrington
 Crook County Medical Service - Sundance
 Evanston Regional Hospital - Evanston
 Hot Springs Memorial Hospital - Thermopolis
 Ivinson Memorial Hospital - Laramie
 Johnson County Health Care Center - Buffalo
 Memorial Hospital of Converse County - Douglas
 Memorial Hospital of Sheridan County - Sheridan
Mountain View Regional Hospital - Casper
 Niobrara Health and Life Center - Lusk
 Platte County Memorial Hospital - Wheatland
 Powell Valley Hospital - Powell
 SageWest Healthcare - Lander - Lander
 SageWest Healthcare - Riverton - Riverton
 Sheridan Memorial Hospital - Sheridan
 South Big Horn County Hospital - Basin/Greybull
 South Lincoln Medical Center - Kemmerer, Wyoming
 St. John's Medical Center - Jackson
 Star Valley Medical Center - Afton
Summit Medical Center - Casper
 Sweetwater County Memorial Hospital - Rock Springs
 US Air Force Hospital - F. E. Warren Air Force Base
 VA Medical Center Cheyenne - Cheyenne
 Washakie Medical Center - Worland
 West Park Hospital - Cody
 Weston County Health Service - Newcastle
 Wyoming Medical Center - Casper
 Wyoming State Hospital - Evanston

References

Wyoming
 
Hospitals